Isabelle Champion Métadier (born June 23, 1947), better known by her artistic name Champion Métadier, is a French visual artist.

Background 
Métadier was born on June 23, 1947, in Tours, France. She was educated at College Art and Design Talm in Tours and Beaux-Arts de Paris. She had her first solo exhibition at the Stevenson and Palluel Gallery in 1977. Her exhibitions took place in 1980 at the Biennale de Paris. In 1983, Champion Métadier received the 1st prize for painting at the 19th Salon d'art contemporain de Montrouge. In 1985, she exhibited at the Pasquale Trisorio gallery in Naples and participated in numerous exhibitions in various museums and institutions in Switzerland, Germany, Sweden, Austria, and South America.

In 2020, the Musée des Arts et Métiers (Paris) gave her carte blanche and exhibits the Toxictoys in its permanent collection until June 2021.

Exhibitions (selected) 

 2020: Champion Métadier TOXICTOYS, Musée des Arts et Métiers, Paris
 2019: Michael Steinberg Fine Art, New York
 2018: Arts Protect 2018, Yvon Lambert Gallery, Paris, Fr
 2017: Galerie Suzanne Tarasieve, Paris
 2015: Champion Métadier, Drawing and Original Prints Museum, Gravelines, Fr
 2014: Le rouge est mis, Musée d'art moderne et d'art contemporain, Nice, Fr
 2013: Dock Art Fair 4th International Contemporary Art Fair, Galerie Louis Gendre, Lyon, Fr

References 

20th-century French painters
21st-century French painters
French women painters
1947 births